The 2015 New Hampshire Wildcats football team represented the University of New Hampshire in the 2015 NCAA Division I FCS football season. They were led by 17th-year head coach Sean McDonnell and played their home games at Cowell Stadium. They were a member of the Colonial Athletic Association. They finished the season 7–5, 5–3 in CAA play to finish in a three-way tie for fourth place. They received an at-large bid to the FCS Playoffs where they lost in the first round to Colgate.

Schedule

Game summaries

at San Jose State

at Colgate

at Stony Brook

Central Connecticut

Elon

at William & Mary

at Delaware

Rhode Island

Richmond

at Albany

Maine

Colgate—NCAA Division I First Round

Ranking movements

References

New Hampshire
New Hampshire Wildcats football seasons
New Hampshire
New Hampshire Wildcats football